Janika Balaž (23 December 1925 – 12 November 1988) was a famous tamburitza musician and band leader from Vojvodina, Serbia.

Life

He was born 1925 to a Hungarian-speaking Romani family with strong musical tradition. His father's surname was Rac (Rác, or Rácz), which was a Hungarian term for Serbs that was considered derogatory, so he took the mother's surname Balaž (Balázs). He grew up in Bečej, where he started playing violin in a local kafana with 10 years of age. When he realized that he couldn't become the best violinist, he switched to ("prim" or "bisernica") tamburitza which he played ever since. Later, he played with "Braća kozaci" band in the area of Subotica and Horgoš. From 1948 to 1951, he worked in Radio Titograd in Montenegro, where he perfected his tamburitza play.

From its foundation in 1951 to the end of his working career he worked in Radio Novi Sad and was a member of its Grand Tamburitza Orchestra. He was spending nights playing with his 8-men band in kafanas of Novi Sad, especially on Petrovaradin Fortress, of which he became one of icons. During his career, he held concerts across the world, including 36 performances in Paris Olympia. Allegedly, he had several offers from United States and Soviet Union to move there and work as a tamburitza teacher, but he never wanted to leave Novi Sad, where he died in 1988.

Janika participated in several documentary and feature films. Songs "Osam tamburaša s Petrovaradina" (Eight tambouritza-players from Petrovaradin) and "Primaši" were dedicated to him. During his career, he worked with many renowned musicians, including Zvonko Bogdan and Júlia Biszák.

After his death, the city of Novi Sad raised a monument (authored by sculptor Lászlo Szilágyi), standing on a square opposite the Petrovaradin fortress across the Danube.

Quote

See also
Music of Vojvodina
Music of Serbia

References

External links
Fan club website
Eurotok 
NIN article 

1925 births
1988 deaths
Musicians from Zrenjanin
Serbian jazz musicians
Serbian Romani people
Serbian people of Hungarian descent
Yugoslav musicians
Yugoslav Romani people
Romani musicians
People of Hungarian-Romani descent